David R. Leitch (born August 22, 1948) was an American politician who served as a member of the Illinois House of Representatives for the 73rd district from 1989 to 2017. He was also a member of the Illinois Senate in 1986 and 1987.

Early life and education 
Leitch was born in Three Rivers, Michigan. He graduated from Kalamazoo College.

Career 
Prior to entering politics, Leitch worked in the baking industry.

On January 31, 1986, Leitch was appointed to the Illinois Senate to succeed the late Prescott E. Bloom. As Bloom was the only candidate to file for the 1986 Republican primary, Leitch and Carl Hawkinson both ran in the primary as write-in candidates. Hawkinson, a member of the Illinois House of Representatives, defeated Leitch by a large margin.

In 1988, Fred J. Tuerk chose to retire from the Illinois House of Representatives. Leitch won the 1988 general election for the open seat. On October 8, 2015, he announced that he would not be seeking re-election. At the time of his announcement, Representative Leitch was the most senior Republican in the Illinois House of Representatives.

References

External links
Representative David R. Leitch (R) 73rd District at the Illinois General Assembly
By session: 98th, 97th, 96th, 95th, 94th, 93rd
State Representative David R. Leitch constituency site
 
David Leitch at Illinois House Republican Caucus

Republican Party Illinois state senators
Republican Party members of the Illinois House of Representatives
1948 births
Living people
21st-century American politicians
People from Three Rivers, Michigan
Kalamazoo College alumni